Joseph "Joe" Mahoney (birth unknown) is a Welsh former rugby union and professional rugby league footballer who played in the 1940s and 1950s.

International honours
Joe Mahoney won 5 caps for Wales (RL) in 1948–1950 while at Oldham, and Dewsbury.

References

External links
Search for "Mahoney" at espn.co.uk (RU)
Statistics at orl-heritagetrust.org.uk
(archived by web.archive.org) Past Players → M & N at cardiffrfc.com
(archived by web.archive.org) Statistics at cardiffrfc.com
Search for "Joseph Mahoney" at britishnewspaperarchive.co.uk
Search for "Joe Mahoney" at britishnewspaperarchive.co.uk

Cardiff RFC players
Dewsbury Rams players
Oldham R.L.F.C. players
Place of birth missing
Possibly living people
Rugby league centres
Rugby union centres
Wales national rugby league team players
Welsh rugby league players
Welsh rugby union players
Year of birth missing